Harouf (in Arabic حاروف) is a village in the Nabatieh Governorate region of southern Lebanon and is located north of the Litani River. The village is economically important due to the presence of a famous industrial area in it known as "Marj Harouf".

History
In  the 1596 tax records, it was named as a village,  Haruf, in the Ottoman nahiya (subdistrict) of Sagif  under the liwa' (district) of Safad, with a population of  12  households, all Muslim. The villagers paid a fixed  tax-rate of 25%  on  agricultural products, such as wheat, barley, fruit trees, goats and beehives, in addition to  "occasional revenues"; a total of 2,459 akçe.

In 1875, Victor Guérin found Harouf to be a village of about 140 Metualis. He further noted several sarcophagi, convincing him that it was an ancient place.

References

Bibliography

External links
Harouf (Nabatiyeh), Localiban

Populated places in Nabatieh District
Shia Muslim communities in Lebanon